Oberliga  may refer to:

Association football 
 Oberliga (football), currently the fifth tier of the German football league system, formerly the first
 DDR-Oberliga, the first tier of football in East Germany until 1990, replaced by the NOFV-Oberliga
 NOFV-Oberliga, replaced the DDR-Oberliga in 1990, now the fifth tier of football in the region

Ice hockey 
 Austrian Oberliga
 Oberliga (ice hockey), formerly the first tier, now the third tier of ice hockey in Germany